Francina "Fanny" Elsje Blankers-Koen (26 April 191825 January 2004) was a Dutch track and field athlete, best known for winning four gold medals at the 1948 Summer Olympics in London. She competed there as a 30-year-old mother of two, earning her the nickname "the Flying Housewife", and was the most successful athlete at the event.

Having started competing in athletics in 1935, she took part in the 1936 Summer Olympics a year later. Although international competition was stopped by World War II, Blankers-Koen set several world records during that period, in events as diverse as the long jump, the high jump, and sprint and hurdling events.

Apart from her four Olympic titles, she won five European titles and 58 Dutch championships, and set or tied 12 world records – the last, pentathlon, in 1951 aged 33. She retired from athletics in 1955, after which she became captain of the Dutch female track and field team. In 1999, she was voted "Female Athlete of the Century" by the International Association of Athletics Federations (IAAF). Her Olympic victories are credited with helping to eliminate the belief that age and motherhood were barriers to success in women's sport.

Early life
Fanny Koen was born on 26 April 1918 in Lage Vuursche (near Baarn) to Arnoldus and Helena Koen. Her father was a government official who competed in the shot put and discus. She had five brothers. As a teenager, she enjoyed tennis, swimming, gymnastics, ice skating, fencing and running. Standing , she was a natural athlete. It soon became clear she had a talent for sports, but she could not decide which sport to pick. A swimming coach advised her to concentrate on running because there were already several top swimmers in the Netherlands at that time (such as Rie Mastenbroek), and she would have a better chance to qualify for the Olympics in a track event.

Her first appearance in the sport was in 1935, aged 17. Her first competition was a disappointment, but in her third race, she set a national record in the 800 m. Fanny Koen soon made the Dutch team, although as a sprinter, not a middle-distance runner. At that time, 800 m was generally considered too physically demanding for female contestants, and had been removed from the Olympic programme after 1928. The following year, her coach and future husband, Jan Blankers, a former Olympic triple-jumper who had participated in the 1928 Olympics, encouraged her to enter the trials for the 1936 Olympics in Berlin. At eighteen years old, she was selected to compete in the high jump and the 4 × 100 m relay.

At the Berlin Olympics, the high jump and the 4 × 100 m relay competitions were held on the same day. In the high jump, she took fifth place (shared with two other jumpers) while the Dutch relay team came in fifth in the final (the sixth team in the final, Germany, was disqualified). She also gained the autograph of American athlete Jesse Owens; it became her most treasured possession.

Slowly, Koen rose to the top. In 1938, she ran her first world record (11.0 seconds in the 100 yards), and she also won her first international medals. At the European Championships in Vienna, she won the bronze in both the 100 and 200 m, which were both won by Stanisława Walasiewicz. Many observers, and Koen herself, expected her to do well at the upcoming Olympics, which were due to be held in Helsinki in July 1940.

However, the outbreak of World War II put a stop to the preparations. The Olympics were formally cancelled on 2 May 1940, a week before the Netherlands was invaded.

World War II 
Just prior to the invasion, Koen had become engaged, and on 29 August 1940, she married Jan Blankers (who was fifteen years her senior), thereupon changing her name to Blankers-Koen.  Blankers was then a sports journalist and the coach of the Dutch women's athletics team, even though he originally thought women should not compete in sports – not an unusual opinion at the time.  However, his attitude toward female athletes changed after he fell in love with Koen.

When Blankers-Koen gave birth to her first child, Jan Junior, in 1942, Dutch media automatically assumed her career would be over. Top female athletes who were married were rare at the time, and it was considered inconceivable that a mother would be an athlete. Blankers-Koen resumed training only weeks after their son's birth.

During the war, domestic competition in sports continued in German-occupied Holland, and Blankers-Koen set six new world records between 1942 and 1944. The first came in 1942, when she improved the world mark in the 80 m hurdles. The following year, she did even better. First, she improved the high jump record by an unequalled 5 cm from 1.66 m to 1.71 m in a specially arranged competition in Amsterdam on 30 May. Then, she tied the 100 m world record, but this was never recognised officially, as she competed against men when setting the record. She closed out the season with a new world record in the long jump, 6.25 m on 19 September 1943. The latter record would stand until 1954.

Circumstances were not easy, and it became harder to get enough food, especially for an athlete in training. Despite this, Blankers-Koen managed to break the  world record in May 1944. At the same meet, she ran with the relay team that broke the 4 ×  world record. The German press was excited, as the previous record had been set by an English team. Months later, she helped break the 4 × 200 m record, which was held by Germany. In an act of defiance, the women wore outfits with national symbols while setting the record.

The winter of 1944–45, known as the Hongerwinter (hunger winter), was severe, and there was a great lack of food, especially in the big cities. She gave birth to a daughter, Fanneke, in 1945 and in contrast to her previous post-birth activities she took seven months off from sport and only undertook limited training.

"The flying housewife" 

The first major international event after the war was the 1946 European Championships, held in Oslo, Norway. The championships were a slight disappointment. In the 100 m semi-finals, held during the high jump final, she fell and failed to qualify for the final. Competing with bruises from the fall, she ended the high jump competition in fourth. The second day was more successful, as she won the 80 m hurdles event, and led the Dutch relay team to victory in the 4 × 100 m.

As the leading female athlete in the Netherlands – in 1947 she won national titles in six women's events – Blankers-Koen was assured of a place on the Dutch team for the first post-war Olympics, held in London. After her experience in Oslo, she decided not to take part in all events, but limit herself to four: she dropped the high jump and long jump to concentrate on the 100 m, the 200 m, the 80 m hurdles, and the 4 × 100 m relay (competition rules also prevented an athlete from competing in more than three individual track and field events). 

Although she displayed her form two months before the Games by beating her own 80 m hurdles world record – one of the six world records that she held at that time – some journalists questioned her, suggesting 30 years was too old for a woman to be an athlete. The British athletics team's manager, Jack Crump, opined that she was "too old to make the grade". Many in the Netherlands were concerned for the welfare of the family, saying that she should stay at home to look after her children, not compete in athletics events.

Her first competition was the 100 m, and she qualified easily for the semi-finals, in which she set the fastest time. The final (2 August) was held on a muddy track and in rainy conditions. Blankers-Koen sped to the finish line in 11.9, easily beating her opponents Dorothy Manley and Shirley Strickland, who took second and third.

Fanny Blankers-Koen thereby became the first Dutch athlete to win an Olympic title in athletics, but she was more concerned with her next event, the 80 m hurdles. Her chief opponent was Maureen Gardner, also coached by Blankers-Koen's husband and who had equalled Blankers-Koen's world record prior to the Games, and would be running for her home crowd. Both athletes made the final, in which Blankers-Koen got off to a bad start (she would later claim she thought there had been a false start). 

She picked up the pace quickly, but was unable to shake off Gardner, who kept close until the finish line, and the two finished almost simultaneously. When the British national anthem was played, the crowd in Wembley Stadium cheered, and Blankers-Koen briefly thought she had been beaten. However, the anthem was played in honour of the British royal family, which entered the stadium at that time. Examination of the finish photo clearly showed that not Gardner, but Blankers-Koen had won, although both received the same time (11.2 seconds).

In spite of her successes, Blankers-Koen nearly failed to start in the semi-finals of the 200 m, held the day after the hurdles final. Shortly before the semi-final, she broke down because of homesickness. After a long talk with her husband, she decided to run anyway, and qualified for the final with great ease. The final, on 6 August, was again held in the pouring rain, but Blankers-Koen completed the inaugural Olympic 200 m for women in 24.4, seven-tenths of a second ahead of runner-up Audrey Williamson – still the largest margin of victory in an Olympic 200 m final. Audrey Patterson placed in third, thereby becoming the first African American woman to win an Olympic medal.

The 4 × 100 m final was held on the final day of the track and field competitions. The Dutch team, consisting of Xenia Stad-de Jong, Netty Witziers-Timmer, Gerda van der Kade-Koudijs and Blankers-Koen, qualified for the final, but just before the final, Blankers-Koen was missing. She had gone out to shop for a raincoat, and arrived just in time for the race. As the last runner, she took over the baton in third place, some five meters behind the Australian and Canadian runners. In spite of a careful and slow exchange, she caught up with the leaders, crossing the line a tenth of a second before the Australian woman.

Fanny Blankers-Koen won four of the nine women's events at the 1948 Olympics, competing in eleven heats and finals in eight days. She was the first woman to win four Olympic gold medals, and achieved the feat in a single Olympics. Dubbed "the flying housewife", "the flying Dutchmam", and "amazing Fanny" by the international press, she was welcomed back home in Amsterdam by an immense crowd. After a ride through the city, pulled by four white horses, she received a lot of praise and gifts. From the city of Amsterdam, she received a new bicycle: "to go through life at a slower pace" and "so she need not run so much". Queen Juliana made her a knight of the Order of Orange Nassau.

After London 

Now known all over the world, Blankers-Koen received many offers for endorsements, advertisements, publicity stunts, and the like. Because of the strict amateurism rules in force at the time, she had to turn most offers down. However, in 1949, she travelled abroad to promote women's athletics, flying to Australia and the United States.

Blankers-Koen had been chosen the 1948 Helms Athletic Foundation World Trophy Winner for Europe, and in 1949 she travelled to Los Angeles to compete in the Los Angeles Coliseum Relays.
In 1950, a controversial episode involving one of Blankers-Koen's competitors occurred. A year earlier, a new Dutch sprint talent, Foekje Dillema had made her breakthrough. In 1950, she broke the national record in the 200 m, and some journalists already dubbed her as the "new Fanny". That year, Dillema was the first subject of the International Association of Athletics Federations's mandatory sex verification policy and was subjected to a "sex test", the details of which were never revealed. As a result, she was expelled by the Royal Dutch Athletics Federation from athletics for the rest of her life and the 200 m record she took from Blankers-Koen was erased. Dillema, who never spoke publicly on the subject, died in December 2007.

After the death of Dillema, a forensic test on body cells obtained from her clothing found that there was a Y-chromosome in Dillema's DNA, which indicated she was possibly a genetic mosaic or a true hermaphrodite. Most of the other women on the team at the time suspect it was an attempt by Blankers and Blankers-Koen to eliminate an opponent, although this has never been confirmed.

The same year, Blankers-Koen almost repeated her Olympic performance at the European Championships in Brussels. She won the titles in the 100 m, 200 m and 80 m hurdles, all with large margins of victory (four-tenths of a second or more), but narrowly missed out on a fourth win in the relay, which was won by the British team.

At age 34, she took part in her third Olympics, which were held in Helsinki. Although she was in good physical condition, she was severely hampered by a skin boil. She qualified for the 100 m semi-finals, but forfeited a start to save herself for the hurdles race. She reached the final in that event, but after knocking over the second hurdle, she abandoned the race. It was her last major competition. On 7 August 1955, Fanny Blankers-Koen was victorious for the last time, winning the national title in the shot put, her 58th Dutch title.

Later life 
After her athletic career, Blankers-Koen served as the team leader of the Dutch athletics team, from the 1958 European Championships to the 1968 Summer Olympics.

In 1977, Blankers-Koen's husband Jan died. Some years after his death, she moved back to her old hometown of Hoofddorp. In 1981, the Fanny Blankers-Koen Games, an international athletics event, were established. They are still held annually in Hengelo.

Blankers-Koen's last moment of glory came in 1999. At a gala in Monaco, organized by the International Association of Athletics Federations (IAAF), she was declared the "Female Athlete of the Century". She was very surprised to have won, audibly asking "You mean it is me who has won?"

In the years prior to her death, Blankers-Koen suffered from Alzheimer's disease and lived in a psychiatric nursing home. She was also deaf. She died at age 85 in Hoofddorp on 25 January 2004.

A year before her death, the first biography of Blankers-Koen was published, Een koningin met mannenbenen (A Queen with Men's Legs) by journalist Kees Kooman. Through many interviews with relatives, friends and contemporary athletes, it paints a previously unknown picture of her. During her successful years, Dutch and international media portrayed her as the perfect mother (hence her nickname "the flying housewife"), who was modest about her own achievements. Kooman's book portrays Blankers-Koen in a different light, as a woman who found it difficult to show affection and who was driven by a desire to win. Blankers-Koen had previously written an autobiography in 1949 with help from her husband.

Her personal record on the 100 m of 11.5 remained the Amsterdam club record of Phanos for 62 years. It was finally broken in May 2010 by Jamile Samuel.

Fanny Blankers-Koen Carrièreprijs 
The Fanny Blankers-Koen Carrièreprijs was created by NOC*NSF to honour the achievements of Dutch sportspeople and was first given on 9 December 2005. For its inauguration, five people were awarded the prize. Since then, the award has been given to an individual annually.

Awards and tributes

Dutch Athlete of the Year: 1937, 1940, 1943
Associated Press Female Athlete of the Year: 1948
Knight of the Order of Orange-Nassau: 1949
Medal of the NOC*NSP: 1949
Royal Dutch Athletics Federation honorary member: 1949
IAAF Female Athlete of the 20th Century: 1999
IAAF Hall of Fame: 2012

She was among the women included in the 1001 Vrouwen uit de Nederlandse geschiedenis, a dictionary of biography covering 1001 important Dutchwomen. In a 2004 national poll, Blankers-Koen ranked 29th for De Grootste Nederlander (The Greatest Netherlander); she was the third highest sportsperson (after footballers Johan Cruyff and Marco van Basten) and the seventh highest woman in the poll.

Two public statues of her have been erected in the Netherlands: the first was made by Han Rehm and placed in Rotterdam in 1954 and the second, made by Antoinette Ruiter, was placed on 9 May 2007 in Hengelo. Also in 2007, a plaque was placed in the sportspark at Olympiaplein in Amsterdam declaring "Hier trainde Fanny Blankers-Koen" ("Fanny Blankers-Koen trained here"). 

Several locations have been named in her honour, including Blankers-Koen Park in Newington, New South Wales, the location of the Sydney 2000 Olympic Village, a fire station in Amsterdam (Fanny Blankers-Koenkazerne), a park in Almere (FBK-sportpark), and a sports hall in Hoofddorp where she lived (Fanny Blankers-Koen hal).

Blankers-Koen was honoured with a Google Doodle on 26 April 2018, on what would have been her 100th birthday.

International competitions

National titles

Records

Personal bests

National records

  † Blankers-Koen ran national record times of 11.4 and 23.7 seconds for the 100 m and 200 m, respectively, at the 1952 Dutch Athletics Championships. However, these records were later rescinded after it was shown that the collapse of a nearby railway track had caused the running track to be excessively downhill.

See also

List of multiple Olympic gold medalists at a single Games
List of multiple Olympic medalists at a single Games
List of multiple Olympic gold medalists
List of Olympic medalists in athletics (women)
List of 1948 Summer Olympics medal winners
List of European Athletics Championships medalists (women)
List of Dutch people
List of Dutch sportspeople
List of people from Amsterdam
List of professional sports families
List of sports venues named after individuals
Sport in the Netherlands
100 metres at the Olympics
200 metres at the Olympics
4 × 100 metres relay at the Olympics
Netherlands at the Olympics
Netherlands at the European Athletics Championships
Sprint hurdles at the Olympics

References

Bibliography

External links 

 Fanny Blankers-Koen Games
 
 
 
 

1918 births
2004 deaths
People from Baarn
People from Haarlemmermeer
Dutch female sprinters
Dutch female long jumpers
Dutch female hurdlers
Dutch female high jumpers
Olympic athletes of the Netherlands
Olympic gold medalists for the Netherlands
Olympic gold medalists in athletics (track and field)
Athletes (track and field) at the 1936 Summer Olympics
Athletes (track and field) at the 1948 Summer Olympics
Athletes (track and field) at the 1952 Summer Olympics
Medalists at the 1948 Summer Olympics
European Athletics Championships medalists
World record setters in athletics (track and field)
Sportspeople from Utrecht (province)